How Can It Be is the debut studio album by American contemporary Christian music singer and songwriter Lauren Daigle. The album was released on April 14, 2015, through Centricity Music. LifeWay Christian Bookstore was permitted to release the album on April 11, 2015. The lead single from the album, "How Can It Be", was released on July 8, 2014. A deluxe edition of the album was released on May 6, 2016.

The album has since sold 1 million copies in the United States.

Critical reception 

Signaling in a four star review by CCM Magazine, Grace S. Aspinwall realizes, "From top to bottom, this project showcases one of the best and brightest young voices in Christian music with the skills and prowess of a veteran songstress." Christopher Smith, indicating in a four star review at Jesus Freak Hideout, recognizes, "you've got some inspiring worship tunes on How Can It Be." Specifying in a five star review for New Release Today, Kevin Davis responds, "How Can it Be is a masterpiece with compelling music and lyrics and stellar singing and it is my worship album of the year." Timothy Yap of Hallels.com wrote that "Many contemporary Christian artists may sing about the marvel of redemption, but when Lauren Daigle does it with her smoky alto she commands attention.  There's a holy gravitas that resonates within this Louisiana native's pipes that we can't help but be drawn in." Jeanie Law of Breathcast summarized that "Lauren Daigle's debut release How Can It Be on Centricity Music will serve as a breath of fresh air for music lovers with its raw emotion, honest lyrics, and Daigle's infectious voice." In a nine out of ten review by Cross Rhythms, Tony Cummings describes, "Paul Mabury's production is impeccable, Lauren's vocals are richly expressive, and all in all 'How Can It Be' is an inspiring full length debut from a singer who will surely be here for the long haul." Michael Dalton, in a four out of five review from The Phantom Tollbooth, says, "The voice I hear on Lauren Daigle’s debut, How Can it Be, reminds me of Adele and the International House of Prayer’s, Misty Edwards. Each of them can sound both smoky and delicate. It adds weight in this God-directed release." In a 4.0 out of five review by Christian Music Review, Laura Chambers writes, "How Can It Be invites us to approach God with a blend of wonder at His majesty and faith in His goodness." Christian St. John, awarding the album five stars from Christian Review Magazine, writes, "How Can It Be is a beautifully produced album and the musicianship is excellent on each and every track."

Accolades 

The song, "How Can It Be", was No. 9, on the Worship Leaders Top 20 Songs of 2015 list.

 Track listing 

 Personnel Vocalists Lauren Daigle – lead vocals and background vocals
 Morgan Harper Nichols – background vocals on "O' Lord", "Here's My Heart", and "Loyal"
 David Leonard of All Sons & Daughters – background vocals on "Power to Redeem"
 Leslie Jordan of All Sons & Daughters – background vocals on "Power to Redeem"Instrumentalists'

 Paul Mabury – drums, percussion, additional programming, additional keyboards
 Jason Ingram – additional keyboards, additional acoustic guitar
 Mike Payne – electric guitars
 Tony Lucido – bass
 Hank Bentley – electric guitars and acoustic guitars
 Matt Butler – cello
 Joe Williams – editing, keyboards, additional electric guitars, additional guitars, and trumpet on "Trust In You"
 Stephen Lieweke – acoustic guitar on "Salt & Light" and electric guitar on "Power to Redeem"
 Keith Everette Smith – additional digital editing

Charts

Weekly charts

Year-end charts

Decade-end charts

Singles

Other charted songs

Certifications

References 

2015 debut albums
Centricity Music albums
Lauren Daigle albums
Soul albums by American artists